Maria Luisa may refer to:

People
 Anna Maria Luisa de' Medici (1667–1743), last lineal descent of the House of Medici
 Maria Luisa Ambrosini (20th century), non-fiction author
 Maria Luisa, Duchess of Lucca (1782–1824), Queen of Etruria
 María Luisa Elío (1926–2009), Spanish writer and actress
 María Luisa Gil (born 1977), Cuban model and actress
 María Luisa Josefa (1866–1937), Mexican Roman Catholic nun
 Maria Luisa of Orléans (1662–1689), Queen consort of Spain
 Maria Luisa of Parma (1751–1819), Queen consort of Spain
 Maria Luisa of Savoy (1688–1714), Queen consort of Spain
 Maria Luisa Spaziani (1923–2014), Italian poet
 María Luisa Zea (1913–2002), Mexican actress and singer

Ships
, a number of ships with this name

See also

 Luisa Maria
 Maria Louisa
 Maria Louise
 Maria Luise
 Marie Louise (disambiguation)
 Marie Luise

Spanish feminine given names